Live at the Ryman may refer to:

 Live at the Ryman: The Greatest Show Ever Been Gave, a 2006 album by Robert Earl Keen
 Live at the Ryman (Marty Stuart album), 2006
 Live at the Ryman (Brothers Osborne album), 2019
 Live at the Ryman, a 2017 album by Tommy Emmanuel

See also 

 At the Ryman, a 1992 album by Emmylou Harris